A finch is a passerine bird, often seed-eating, found chiefly in the northern hemisphere and Africa.

Finch may also refer to:

Places

Canada
Finch, a former township in North Stormont, Ontario
Finch Avenue, a major arterial road running through suburban Toronto
Finch (TTC), a subway station pertaining to Finch Avenue, Toronto
Finch Bus Terminal, a bus terminal pertaining to Finch Avenue, Toronto, but, also serves York Region

Elsewhere
Finch County, New South Wales, Australia
Mount Finch, a mountain in Antarctica

People
Finch (rapper), German rapper
Finch (surname), including a list of people with that name
Justice Finch (disambiguation)
Baron Finch (disambiguation), two titles

Transportation
Finch Restorations, a car restoration company
Pungs Finch, an American automobile

Fleet Finch, a training biplane

Ships
HMS Finch, formerly USS Eagle before her capture in 1813
MV Finch, a ship that tried to deliver supplies to Gaza in May 2011
USS Finch, two American ships

Entertainment and media
Finch (novel), a 2009 fantasy novel by Jeff VanderMeer
Finch (film), a 2021 film starring Tom Hanks
Finch (American band), a post-hardcore group popular in the 2000s
Finch (Australian band), active in the 1970s, later known as Contraband
Finch (Dutch band), a progressive rock group popular in the 1970s
The Finches, American folk pop band
Finch (album), a 2009 album by Murder By Death
Finch (EP), the post-hardcore group's eponymous EP

Facilities and structures
Finch Building (disambiguation), various American buildings
Finch College, a defunct women's college in Manhattan, New York
Finch Field, a baseball venue in Thomasville, North Carolina
Finch House (disambiguation), various American buildings

Other uses
Finch (software), an open-source console-based version of the instant messaging client Pidgin

See also